Naujamiestis is a small town in Panevėžys County, in northeastern Lithuania. According to the 2011 census, the town had a population of 725.

During the start of winter, the town creates large straw structures in the shapes of various animals, houses, and people. At the end of the festival, thousands of people gather for the ritualistic burning of the straw village.

References

Towns in Lithuania
Towns in Panevėžys County
Ponevezhsky Uyezd